Siri Minge (born 4 February 1994) is a Norwegian professional racing cyclist.

See also
 Team Hitec Products

References

External links

1994 births
Living people
Norwegian female cyclists
Place of birth missing (living people)
21st-century Norwegian women